Mount Humphreys is a mountain peak in the Sierra Nevada on the Fresno-Inyo county line in the U.S. state of California. It is the 13th highest peak in California (the highest peak that is not a fourteener), and the highest peak in the Bishop area. The mountain was named by the California Geological Survey of 1873 for Andrew A. Humphreys, the chief engineer of the United States Army at the time.

See also
 List of mountain peaks of California

References

External links
 
 
 

Mountains of Inyo County, California
Mountains of Fresno County, California
Inyo National Forest
Mountains of the John Muir Wilderness
Mount Humphreys
Mountains of Northern California